The 1996 Winston Select 500 was the ninth stock car race of the 1996 NASCAR Winston Cup Series and the 27th iteration of the event. The race was held on Sunday, April 28, 1996, in Lincoln, Alabama at Talladega Superspeedway, a 2.66 miles (4.28 km) permanent triangle-shaped superspeedway. The race took the scheduled 188 laps to complete. At race's end, Morgan–McClure Motorsports driver Sterling Marlin would manage to hold off the field in the final 20 laps to take his fifth career NASCAR Winston Cup Series victory and his first victory of the season. To fill out the top three, Robert Yates Racing driver Dale Jarrett and Richard Childress Racing driver Dale Earnhardt would finish second and third, respectively.

The race was marred by a series of crashes and an overall wreck-filled race. The first major crash included Bill Elliott on lap 79, when Elliott's car would spin into the backstretch grass area and blow over into the air. The car would land on the ground hardly, with Elliott suffering a broken left femur, causing him to miss the next race, the 1996 Save Mart Supermarkets 300. Later into the race on lap 131, driver Ricky Craven would manage to flip wildly into the air and into the protective catch-fence in turn 1, causing a major 13-car pileup. Craven would be knocked unconscious during the crash, and would suffer a broken back in the process.

Background 

Talladega Superspeedway, originally known as Alabama International Motor Superspeedway (AIMS), is a motorsports complex located north of Talladega, Alabama. It is located on the former Anniston Air Force Base in the small city of Lincoln. The track is a tri-oval and was constructed in the 1960s by the International Speedway Corporation, a business controlled by the France family. Talladega is most known for its steep banking and the unique location of the start/finish line that's located just past the exit to pit road. The track currently hosts the NASCAR series such as the NASCAR Cup Series, Xfinity Series and the Camping World Truck Series. Talladega is the longest NASCAR oval with a length of 2.66-mile-long (4.28 km) tri-oval like the Daytona International Speedway, which also is a 2.5-mile-long (4 km) tri-oval.

Entry list 

 (R) denotes rookie driver.

Qualifying 
Qualifying was split into two rounds. The first round was held on Friday, April 26, at 4:00 PM EST. Each driver would have one lap to set a time. During the first round, the top 25 drivers in the round would be guaranteed a starting spot in the race. If a driver was not able to guarantee a spot in the first round, they had the option to scrub their time from the first round and try and run a faster lap time in a second round qualifying run, held on Saturday, April 27, at 12:00 PM EST. As with the first round, each driver would have one lap to set a time. For this specific race, positions 26-32 would be decided on time, and depending on who needed it, a select amount of positions were given to cars who had not otherwise qualified but were high enough in owner's points.

Five drivers would fail to qualify: Phil Barkdoll, Steve Seligman, Bobby Hillin Jr., Delma Cowart, and Chad Little.

Full qualifying results

Race results

References 

1996 NASCAR Winston Cup Series
NASCAR races at Talladega Superspeedway
April 1996 sports events in the United States
1996 in sports in Alabama